Scoparia crocospila is a moth in the family Crambidae. It was described by Turner in 1922. It is found in Australia, where it has been recorded from Victoria.

References

Moths described in 1922
Scorparia